is the largest island in the Koshikijima Islands. Its coasts are washed by East China Sea.

Geography
Shimokoshiki-jima has very rugged terrain even compared to the other Koshikijima Islands, the majority of the island is composed of overlapping mountains 400–500 meters high.

Settlements and administrative units
Kashima, Kagoshima
Shimokoshiki, Kagoshima

History
The site of the island was initially elevated in the Cretaceous period about 80 million years before present. The sites housing dinosaur fossils are located across the island, which together with scenic cliffs propelled the island to the  list. In historical records, Shimokoshiki-jima is first mentioned during the Nara period when it was populated by the Satsuma tribe of the Hayato people. The island was incorporated into Japan by the early Heyan period though. The island belonged to the Christian domain during Nanboku trade period and 35 people were executed in the aftermath of the Shimabara rebellion in 1638.

During the Great Tenmei famine in the 178x period, a large group of inhabitants of Shimokoshiki-jima migrated to Kanoya, Kagoshima. A second wave of migration in 1887–1897, driven by famine, typhoon-related destruction and epidemics, departed to Tanegashima.

Regular communications with the mainland by means of telegraph and scheduled ship service began in 1901. The direct passage of typhoon Ruth over the island again brought severe damage, and the population, which peaked in 1950 at 13,578 people, started to rapidly decline, with over half of inhabitants of the island departing within 20 years.

Modern Shimokoshiki-jima is primarily a fishing island, with 10.9% of population being fishermen as of 2009.

Transportation
Shimokoshiki-jima is connected to Nakakoshiki-jima and through it to Kamikoshiki-jima, by a bridge and two connecting tunnels at Nakakoshiki-jima. This bridge opened on 29 August 2020 after over 9 years of construction.

Ferry lines also connect Shimokoshiki-jima to Kamikoshiki-jima and to Ichikikushikino city on the Kyushu mainland, the latter offering two daily round-trips.

On the island, transportation is provided by public buses operating four routes. Some routes need a prior reservation due to the small number of passengers.

Notable residents
Kajiwara Kagesue - samurai of the Genpei War period
 (1951–present) - TV actor

See also
Kamikoshiki-jima
Koshikijima Islands

External links
 Detailed map of Shimo-Koshiki-jima

References
This article incorporates material from Japanese Wikipedia page 下甑島, accessed 23 August 2017

Islands of Kagoshima Prefecture
Islands of the East China Sea